Rumble is a 2021 American computer-animated sports comedy film directed by Hamish Grieve with a screenplay by Grieve and Matt Lieberman. Loosely based on Monster on the Hill, a graphic novel by Rob Harrell, the film stars the voices of Will Arnett, Geraldine Viswanathan, Terry Crews, Stephen A. Smith, Jimmy Tatro, Tony Danza, Susan Kelechi Watson, Tony Shalhoub, Bridget Everett, Greta Lee, Ben Schwartz, Roman Reigns and Becky Lynch.

Produced by Paramount Animation, WWE Studios, Walden Media and Reel FX Animation Studios, the film was released in the United States on December 15, 2021 on Paramount+. The film received generally mixed reviews from critics with criticism for its writing, characters, and pacing, although the animation and voice acting received some praise.

Plot

In a world where giant monsters and humans coexist, monsters compete in a popular professional wrestling global sport known as monster wrestling, with each city having its own monster wrestler. After the current wrestler for the small town of Stoker, the shark-like Tentacular becomes the new world champion, he announces he no longer wants to represent Stoker. The townspeople are later told if they do not find a new wrestler, they will lose the town's stadium and its revenue, which prompts wrestling enthusiast Winnie Coyle to search for a new monster representative for her town.

Winnie heads to an underground fight and finds Rayburn Jr., the son of the famous late Stoker champion Rayburn Sr., fighting under the name of "Steve The Stupendous". Winnie interferes in the match and causes Steve to win instead of taking a dive, as the underground arena employer wanted. Steve is confronted by his employer and threatened unless he can get the owner back the money she just lost. Winnie tells Steve she can help him get the money by training him to fight Tentacular. Realizing he has no other way to make the money, Steve agrees to be trained.

Steve initially is uninterested in learning how to fight properly and wins his first match by evading his opponent. Steve later tells Winnie he left Stoker because everyone saw him as an extension of his father and could not live up to his name. Winnie learns Steve loves dancing and decides to train him using dance moves. As they progress up the league's rankings, Tentacular announces he and his agent have bought Stoker's stadium and wants to demolish it as Tentacular sees it as a reminder that he will be always compared to Rayburn. Even though Steve repays his underground arena employer, he decides to help Winnie, reveals his identity as Rayburn's son and challenges Tentacular to a match for the stadium.

During the fight, Steve avoids most of the hits by Tentacular in the first round, but Tentacular counters his dance moves in the second round. After convincing Winnie not to give up, Steve, in the third round, lands several hits with his dance moves. Winnie tells Steve to use Tentacular's suckers to stick him to one of the corner posts. When Steve goes in for the final move, he and Tentacular collide and are both knocked out. Tentacular gets up first but is too rattled to end the match. The crowd gets Steve back up by clapping a salsa beat and he is able to defeat Tentacular, becoming the new monster wrestling champion and saving the stadium.

Cast
 Will Arnett as Steve/Rayburn Jr., a giant red reptilian monster and amateur wrestler with a passion for dancing
 Gracen Newton as young Steve/Rayburn Jr.
 Geraldine Viswanathan as Winnie Coyle, an aspiring monster wrestling trainer and Jimbo's daughter
 Kaya McLean as young Winnie Coyle
 Terry Crews as Tentacular, a shark-headed and tentacled monster who is the reigning Monster Wrestling champion and is jealous of Rayburn Sr.'s legacy
 Fred Melamed as the Mayor
 Charles Barkley as Rayburn Sr., Steve's late champion father
 Chris Eubank as King Gorge, a horned bulldog-like monster who is a former champion 
 Bridget Everett as Lady Mayhem, a toucan-like monster with manicured nails who runs the underground wrestling matches
 Ben Schwartz as Jimothy Brett-Chadley III, Tentacular's agent
 Brian Baumgartner as Klonk, a warthog-like monster
 Jimmy Tatro as Lights Out McGinty/Mac, an anglerfish-like monster and wrestling commentator 
 Becky Lynch as Axehammer, a reptile-like monster from the underground wrestling 
 Roman Reigns as Ramarilla Jackson, a gorilla-like monster with ram horns
 Tony Danza as Siggy, Tentacular's elderly coach who was Jimbo Coyle's former assistant and protégé
 Susan Kelechi Watson as Maggie Coyle, Winnie's mother and Jimbo's widow
 Carlos Gómez as Jimbo Coyle, a legendary monster wrestling trainer and Winnie's late father 
 Stephen A. Smith as Marc Remy, a monster wrestling commentator
 Michael Buffer as a Stoker announcer
 Tony Shalhoub as Fred, a man who owns a diner in Stoker
 Greta Lee as the Councilwoman
 John DiMaggio as Tattoo Guy and Betting Guy
 Jamal Duff as Denise
 Carlos Alazraqui as Nerdle, a spider monkey-like monster
 Chris Anthony Lansdowne as Farmer
 Christopher Knights as King Gorge's Coach
 Fred Tatasciore as Referee

Production
On February 18, 2015, Reel FX Creative Studios announced an adaptation of the 2013 graphic novel Monster on the Hill by Rob Harrell, to be written by Matt Lieberman. On April 25, 2018, Paramount Animation announced that joined the film as a co-producer, with Walden Media, at CinemaCon in Las Vegas. DisneyToon Studios vet Bradley Raymond was originally going to direct the film, but due to unknown reasons, he was eventually replaced by DreamWorks Animation veteran Hamish Grieve, head of story for films such as Rise of the Guardians and Captain Underpants: The First Epic Movie, thus making his directorial debut. On June 12, 2019, the title was changed to Rumble.

Casting
The first casting announcement consisted of Geraldine Viswanathan, Will Arnett, and Terry Crews. Becky Lynch, Roman Reigns, Ben Schwartz, Jimmy Tatro, Tony Danza, Susan Kelechi Watson, Carlos Gómez, Charles Barkley, Chris Eubank, Bridget Everett, Michael Buffer, and Stephen A. Smith, revealing their involvement in the film.

Release
On September 19, 2019, the film was scheduled to be released on July 31, 2020. On November 12, 2019, the release date was pushed to January 29, 2021. On October 27, 2020, the release date was then moved to May 14, 2021, and moved again on January 27, 2021 to February 18, 2022 as a result of the COVID-19 pandemic. On November 26, 2021, the film made one final move to December 15, 2021, as a Paramount+ exclusive, cancelling its theatrical release altogether.

Home media
Rumble was released on Blu-ray, DVD, and Digital HD on October 18, 2022 by Paramount Home Entertainment.

Reception
On Rotten Tomatoes, the film has an approval rating of 47% based on reviews from 15 critics, with an average rating of 5.20/10. On Metacritic, the film has a weighted average score of 48 out of 100 based on reviews from 5 critics, indicating "mixed or average reviews".

References

External links

2020s American animated films
2020s sports comedy films
2020s monster movies
2021 films
2021 comedy films
2021 computer-animated films
American animated comedy films
American computer-animated films
American sports comedy films
Animated films about friendship
Animated films based on comics
Animated sports films
Anime-influenced Western animation
2020s English-language films
Films based on American comics
Films postponed due to the COVID-19 pandemic
Films not released in theaters due to the COVID-19 pandemic
Films scored by Lorne Balfe
Films with screenplays by Matt Lieberman
Giant monster films
Kaiju films
Paramount Animation films
Paramount Pictures animated films
Paramount Pictures films
Paramount+ original films
Professional wrestling films
Reel FX Creative Studios films
Walden Media films
WWE Studios films